General elections were held in Tonga on 10 and 11 March 1999 to elect members of the Legislative Assembly of Tonga. Voter turnout was 50.7%. Pro-reform candidates won a majority of seats, despite receiving fewer votes.

Results

Elected members

References

Tonga
1999 in Tonga
Elections in Tonga
March 1999 events in Oceania